The third season of the Naruto anime series, titled "3rd Stage" in Japan, is directed by Hayato Date, and produced by Studio Pierrot and TV Tokyo. Based on Masashi Kishimoto's manga series, the season follows Sasuke Uchiha leaving the Hidden Leaf Village, with the hopes of gaining more power by joining up with Orochimaru. The season aired from September 15, 2004 to June 29, 2005 on TV Tokyo. 

The English dub aired on both Cartoon Network's Toonami and YTV's Bionix programming blocks from August 25, 2007 to February 16, 2008.

Sony Pictures Entertainment collected the episodes in a total of twelve DVD volumes, each containing four episodes, between January 1 and December 7, 2005. The English adaptation of these dub was released between twenty-first and thirty-second DVD volumes released by Viz Media, while various compilations were later released.

The Japanese version of this season feature seven theme musics: three openings and four endings. The endings are "Ryūsei" (流星, lit. The English version replaces the endings with an instrumental version of "Rise" by Jeremy Sweet and Ian Nickus.



Episode list

References

2004 Japanese television seasons
2005 Japanese television seasons
Naruto episodes